Ngäbe-Buglé is the largest and most populous of Panama's five comarcas indígenas. It was created in 1997 from lands formerly belonging to the provinces of Bocas del Toro, Chiriquí, and Veraguas. The capital is known as Buäbiti in Guaymí and Llano Tugrí in Spanish.

Administrative divisions
Ngäbe-Buglé Comarca is sub-divided into 3 sub-regions, 9 districts and 70 corregimientos:

History
Starting in 1972, the Panamanian government was required to establish comarcas, demarcated regions in which indigenous groups possess exclusive land rights and considerable administrative autonomy. Within comarcas, people elect a General assembly, governor, and any number of regional and local leaders, although the government still controls public expenditure and tax revenues within the territory. The comarca Ngäbe-Buglé, located in north western Panama, was formed in 1997 both as a latent result of government promise and of considerable political pressure from the Ngäbe-Buglé, united by threats of natural resource exploitation and environmental degradation on their ancestral lands. The territory is made up of land previously belonging to the provinces of Bocas del Toro, Chiriquí, and Veraguas, and divided into seven districts (listed above with capitals); the capital of the entire comarca is Büäbti, located in the Müna district. As the Ngäbe-Buglé population tends to identify more with their communities than with an ethnicity and is distributed rather unevenly, the political organization that prompted the formation of their comarca is fairly unusual, but nonetheless demonstrates a powerful capacity to influence government actions.

Physical geography and climate

Ngäbe-Buglé comarca is characterized by mountainous terrain, steep slopes and generally nutrient poor soil with high rock content, all characteristics that make farming difficult. On the Caribbean slope there is no dry season and tropical forest dominates the landscape; on the Pacific slope there is a windy dry season (December to April) and a wet season.  As a result of greater seasonal variation, there are more localized geographies on the Pacific slope and vegetation consists of grasses mixed with tropical forest cover. Small perennial streams and larger rivers run on both sides of the continental divide and are used for bathing, laundry, and drinking.  In the region most travel is done on foot or horseback as there are few year-round access roads leading into the comarca (the first ever starting out as a mine access road that runs up to Buäbti and continues to Escopeta, the location of the Cerro Colorado mine) from San Felix, a city connected to the interamericana highway via Las Cruces.

Cultural groups
Although closely associated and collectively referred to as the Guaymí, the Ngäbe and Buglé are two separate linguistic/indigenous groups whose languages are mutually unintelligible. The larger group, the Ngäbe, speak Ngäbere, while the smaller group, the Buglé, speak Buglére; both are members of the Chibchan language family. Collectively, these two groups make up the largest indigenous population in Panama. Note the difference in spelling of Ngäbe and Ngöbe; the two variations depend on local dialects. The vowel low-back-rounded sound indicated by ä does not exist in Spanish and is confused with "o". (Since newspapers know the vowel should have a dieresis on it they often misspell it as "ö".) The sound represented by "ä" is virtually similar to the sound "aw" in the word "saw". The spelling Ngäbe, used here, is the more widely spread (/correct) spelling in Ngäbere.

Daily life
The Guaymí generally live in houses supported by sticks with a grass or zinc roof and dirt floor, wealthier families may have a cement floor. In each house a platform under the roof is used for food storage and there are a number of raised bed platforms.

Chácaras (called kra in Ngäbere), are sturdy bags made from plant fibers. They are used both as storage units and to transport materials. Occasionally you can even see infants being transported in a chácara. Some women also make these bags to sell so they may participate in the informal economy.

Families have a few large cooking pots called pailas and many keep chicha, a corn drink, in the house.

Guaymí men typically wear homemade multi-colored pants, straw hats and rubber boots, while women wear full bright colored dresses with shoulder and neckline adornments (nagua) and embroidered bands around the waist and bottom.  Women generally do not wear shoes.  These items are usually made at home with hand crank sewing machines and, like chácaras, sold for extra income.

The filing of teeth to a point using a machete sharpener is not uncommon among Guaymí men and women, although the practice is generally carried out in more traditional areas.

Families are usually rather large and often groups of women live close together so they can assist each other when caring for children.  Polygamy was once common among the Ngäbe-Buglé as the number of wives and children a man has signifies prestige. It is no longer common since supporting multiple wives and large families is increasingly difficult.

Social capital and reciprocity networks formed through a kinship system are important for reducing economic and social resource vulnerability while creating opportunity for families to cooperate and take advantage of more opportunities that will help them and other members of their kinship group get by.  Marriage and kinship relations also play a large part in determining land ownership and use rights.

Land use
As the Ngäbe-Buglé typically practice subsistence agriculture, definitions of land ownership and use are of pinnacle importance to every household, especially as population increases in proportion to arable land in the comarca and productive land is degraded by excessive use. The intricate system on which land resources are allocated is based on the kinship system. Ownership rights to unclaimed land are established through occupation and farming, although very little fertile land in the comarca remains unclaimed. Members of a kinship group collectively own land, but those who live in the village on the land control it. Undeniable rights to this collectively owned land belong to each member of the kinship group, while borrowed rights are often extended to the members of a spouses family, although these rights can be revoked. In this way, social organization shapes the pattern of economic life and livelihood for most Guaymí. The most common crops grown in the comarca Ngäbe-Buglé (Ngobeland) are corn, rice, beans, otoe, bananas, and coffee although people also grow tomatoes, peppers and other vegetables in smaller gardens at home. Fruits such as mangos, oranges, nance, grow seasonally along with cacao, all of which supplement the Guaymí diet. Meat is rarely eaten although many families keep cows, pigs, ducks, and chickens (mostly egg laying); sardines are a common staple and hojaldras (fried Panamanian bread) are sometimes eaten for breakfast. Most farming is done on land cleared using slash and burn techniques, and due to growing population pressures, this land is rarely left fallow for sufficient time, so crop yields tend to decrease over time.

Economy and resources
As subsistence agriculture becomes less and less reliable, the Guaymí people have started to participate in the cash economy, which provides some relatively accessible alternatives for generating capital and obtaining necessary amenities and resources. Labor is one abundant resource the Guaymí possess, although due to poor education and low human capital including health and nutrition, the labor force is rather unskilled. As a result, many men serve as migrant agricultural workers or leave the comarca to seek other types of informal jobs. 2008. Many men work during the coffee harvest in the Chiriqui Highlands including Boquete and Santa Clara.  This region of Panama is known for high quality shade-grown, and in some cases, organic coffee. The Guaymí also harvest seasonal vegetables grown at higher altitudes.  Women also participate in the informal economy by making chacaras, naguas and jewelry to sell, and some men sew pants or weave hats to do the same. Social capital is again salient to participation in the informal economy as relationships provide people with new opportunities to make money; social capital can even be a mechanism used to attract help from both governmental and non-governmental organizations.

Adversity and modernity
The Ngäbe-Buglé experience much adversity as a result of contemporary conditions.  As localized problems of land and crop shortage grow into a more generalized issue, and it becomes more difficult to generate capital in a shrinking labor market, malnutrition is prevalent, especially in children and expecting mothers. Attempts to generate capital by becoming a migrant worker also have negative social effects including added strains on family structure and increased pressure on women to provide for their children alone.  The dispersed nature of the population also makes existing medical care hard to access, and a general lack of potable water and sanitation services cause a myriad of health problems. Lack of sufficient infrastructure and under provision of social services by the government is often the root of many problems that plague the most rural areas.

Prevalence of poor Spanish skills is also an issue as Guaymí people are often unaware of legal rights and hence either fail to communicate complaints or to use the paths of legal recourse available to them when it would be beneficial to do so. This condition especially affects women because far fewer of them speak Spanish than men. Levels of secondary education are also low in the comarca Ngäbe-Buglé as children are financially limited and transportation to secondary schooling presents a great challenge for many families.  As a result, only ~18% of children ages 15–19 in the comarca Ngöbe-Buglé have schooling beyond the sixth grade.

Finally, many Guaymí communities are threatened by environmental degradation caused by both farming and government or corporate exploitation of their land. The Cerro Colorado copper deposit, one of the world's largest deposits of copper ore is located in the comarca Ngäbe-Buglé. Mining in the area, although it is legal because the property rights of subsurface resources belong to the state, poses a great environmental threat as waste materials from extraction and processing pollute local watersheds. Although they may provide temporary income, mining endeavors also have many adverse social and cultural effects in the comarca and most natives are opposed to mineral exploitation on their lands.

Notes

References

 Aguilar, Renato, and Guillermo García-Huidobro. "Panama: Indigenous Peoples". Santiago-Gothenburg: January 2001. Retrieved on 2010-02-16.
 Gjording, Chris N. (1981). The Cerro Colorado Copper Project and the Guyamí Indians of Panama. Cambridge, Massachusetts: Cultural Survival.
 Young, Philip D. (1971). Ngawbe: Tradition and Change Among the Western Guyamí of Panama. Chicago: The Board of Trustees of the University of Illinois.

 
Comarcas of Panama
States and territories established in 1997
1997 establishments in Panama